A UFO (or unidentified flying object) is an aerial phenomenon reported without being identified.

UFO also may refer to:

Computer technology
 .ufo, the file extension for Ulead PhotoImpact documents
 Unified File and Object (UFO), object storage architecture
 UHF Follow-On satellite, a series of US military communications satellites
 Unified Font Object, an XML-based future proof open format for digital fonts

Art, entertainment and media

Film and television
 UFO (1956 film), directed by Winston Jones
 U.F.O. (1993 film), starring Roy "Chubby" Brown
 U.F.O. (2012 film), with Jean-Claude Van Damme
 UFO (2018 film), directed by Ryan Eslinger, starring Alex Sharp, Gillian Anderson, about an airport sighting
 UFO (2022 film), a Turkish Netflix film
 UFO (docuseries), 2021 television documentary by J.J. Abrams
 UFO (TV series), 1970s TV series by Gerry Anderson
 UFO Ultramaiden Valkyrie, 2000s manga and anime television series

Music

Bands and performers
 UFO (musician) (born 1981), Danish hip hop artist, rapper and singer
 Ufo361 (born 1988), German rapper
 UFO (band), an English hard rock band
 UFO, the original name of the English R&B group better known as JLS
 UFO Yepha, Danish hip hop duo
 The Unidentified Flying Objects, an American rock band
 United Future Organization, a Japanese jazz duo

Albums
 U.F.O. (album), a 1969 album by Jim Sullivan
 UFO EP, by Torch
 UFO (Newton Faulkner EP), by Newton Faulkner

Songs
 "UFO" (Mallrat song featuring Allday), (2018)
 "UFO" (Pink Lady song) (1977)
 "UFO", song by ESG on their EP ESG (1981)
 "UFO" (Sneaky Sound System song) (2007)
"U.F.O." (Coldplay song) (2011)
 "UFO" (Vigiland song) (2014)
"U.F.O.", song by Blonde Redhead on their album La Mia Vita Violenta (1995)
 "UFO", song by D-Block Europe and Aitch from the album The Blue Print: Us vs. Them (2020)

Other musical works
 UFO (Michael Daugherty composition)
 UFOetry, multimedia UFO rock opera

Video games
 UFO Interactive Games, American video game company

UFO Defense family
 UFO: Enemy Unknown, AKA X-COM: UFO Defense
 UFO: Aftermath  (2003)
 UFO: Aftershock (2005)
 UFO: Afterlight (2007)
 UFO: Alien Invasion (2003)

Other video games
 UFO: A Day in the Life (1999) by Love-de-Lic
 UFO: Extraterrestrials(2007) by Chaos Concept
 UFO Kamen Yakisoban (1994) for Super Famicom
 Undefined Fantastic Object (2009), the twelfth entry in the Touhou Project series by ZUN
 UFOs (1997), adventure game by Artech

Other works
 UFOs: The Greatest Stories, 1996 short-story anthology by Martin H. Greenberg

Games and sports
 Claw vending machine AKA UFO
 UFO, a style of delivery in Ten-pin bowling

Clubs
 Ufo (Club, Berlin), Acid House club 
 UFO Club, London underground club

Products and services
 UFO, brand of instant yakisoba 
 UFO (restaurant) in Slovakia
 UFO (ride), amusement park ride

Other uses
 United Farmers of Ontario, Canadian political party c. 1920s
 UFO, variant of float b-boy move
 Ufo (wasp), genus of wasps
 UFO 34 (yacht), a sailboat
 UFO Radio, a radio station in Taiwan
 Uranium Fluorine Oxygen
 Ultra Fast Outflows, winds that come from supermassive black holes
 University of French Ontario, referring to the Université de l'Ontario français

See also
 U-Foes, Marvel Comics supervillain team
 Unidentified flying object (disambiguation)
 Flying saucer (disambiguation)
 Alien (disambiguation)